The Leeds Forge Company manufactured corrugated furnaces for marine steam engine boilers and later, pressed steel railway vehicles, in Leeds, England.

Early history
The company was founded by Samson Fox, who was born in 1838 in Bradford, Yorkshire. Fox had been apprenticed to Smith, Beacock and Tannett of Victoria Foundry, Leeds, successors to Fenton, Murray and Jackson, who were early railway locomotive builders. While at Smith, Beacock and Tannett, Fox became their travelling representative, and became acquainted with Scotts Shipbuilding and Engineering Company of Greenock, who were major shipbuilders on the Firth of Clyde. Scotts provided a substantial proportion of the capital to establish the Leeds Forge at Castleton Field, Armley, Leeds in 1874, initially producing straight and cranked locomotive axles.

The Corrugated Furnace

In 1877 Fox lodged a patent for his Corrugated Furnace. This was a tube (initially iron, later steel) heated and swaged (rolled) under pressure to form corrugations. This increased the surface area of the tube, allowing more energy to transfer from the fire to the boiler. The corrugations also provided additional strength to resist boiler pressure. The next year Fox succeeded in obtaining an order for two American ships and by 1880, after considerable effort, had secured US patents. Also in 1880, the German company Schulz, Knaudt of Essen began production of the Corrugated Furnace under licence from the Leeds Forge. Leeds Forge rejected licence applications from other companies including Taylor Bros, Clarence Ironworks, Leeds and John Brown & Company, Atlas Works, Sheffield. After a slow start with many financial setbacks, Fox introduced the rolling process in 1882 and this was the start of the commercial success of the furnace. From then on, steamships were routinely fitted with the Fox corrugated furnace on both sides of the Atlantic.

Pressed Steel Railway Vehicles

After the success of the corrugated furnace, Fox turned his attention to other products, and in 1887 exhibited in Newcastle his flanged frame plate for railway rolling stock. At that time, and for a long time to come, traditional rolling stock was built of timber frames with timber superstructure. This produced a heavy vehicle that required considerable tractive effort from the locomotive. The pressed steel product was made from relatively lightweight flanged steel that gave comparable strength with considerable saving in dead weight. The construction technique, using male and female dies in a hydraulic press, offered a considerable saving of labour compared to hand-built timber cars. Fox found an ally in the promotion of his pressed steel vehicles in E R Calthrop, who promoted pressed steel rolling stock for his system of narrow gauge railways, and used them on the Barsi Light Railway.

With little interest shown in Britain, Fox took his ideas to the US. By 1893 the works employed 400 men producing 80 tramcars and freight cars per day. In 1896 a larger plant was built in Pittsburgh. In 1899 Fox sold his American operation to rival Charles T. Schoen to form the Pressed Steel Car Company. Schoen had tread a parallel path with the independent invention of the pressed steel car. The Leeds business continued until bought in 1923 by Cammell Laird, which closed the Armley works in 1929.

Customers for Leeds railway cars included First Class Dining Cars for the KCR.

In 1924 the Leeds Forge Company built 50 electric carriages for the New South Wales Government Railways, Australia. The bodies were shipped to Sydney in knocked-down form and assembled at Eveleigh Railway Workshops and Clyde Engineering. They were the first all-steel carriages in Australia.In 1922 they supplied new all steel  sleeping  cars for the blue trains operating from Calais to French  Riviera.(source The Times 14/12/1922)

Railway Locomotives
Leeds Forge was not a locomotive manufacturer, but it did produce in 1928, three Bo-Bo electric hopper cars on behalf of English Electric. They were supplied to British Portland Cement, Greenhithe, Kent.

See also
 List of rolling stock manufacturers

References

External links
Pressed Steel Car Co
The Engineer 1887 06 10

Boilers
Defunct manufacturing companies of the United Kingdom
Locomotive manufacturers of the United Kingdom
Manufacturing companies based in Leeds
Defunct companies based in Leeds
Manufacturing companies established in 1874
Manufacturing companies disestablished in 1929
1874 establishments in England
1929 disestablishments in England
British companies established in 1874
British companies disestablished in 1929